The European Academy of Sociology (EAS) is a fellowship of scholars with expertise in different areas of sociology. It wants to promote particular standards in sociology. EAS was founded in 2000 and Raymond Boudon was its first President. Subsequent Presidents include Peter Hedström and Werner Raub.

At its Annual Meeting, the Academy hands out prizes for the distinguished articles and books, and every year a Fellow or an invited scholar delivers the so-called Academy Lecture. The Lecture is routinely published in the European Sociological Review.

External links
 For additional details, see:

Sociological organizations
Organizations established in 2000